is a former Japanese footballer currently playing as a midfielder.

Career statistics

Club
.

References

External links

1994 births
Living people
Japanese footballers
Association football midfielders
J3 League players
Kamatamare Sanuki players
FC Tokushima players